Lollu Sabha Swaminathan (born 31 January 1959) an Indian actor and comedian on working in the Tamil film and media industry. He appeared in prominent roles in Vijay TV's satiric series Lollu Sabha before becoming a full fledged actor in Tamil films.

Filmography

Television
 Anandha Bhavan
Lollu Sabha
Metti Oli
Kolangal
Arasi
Chellamadi Nee Enakku
Thendral
Vani Rani
 Priyamanaval
All In All Alamelu
Kana Kaanum Kaalangal
 Bigg Boss (Guest)
Joking Bad (2023) as Walter Vetrivel White (Walter White) aka Vellai

References

External links
 

Living people
Tamil male actors
Tamil comedians
Tamil male television actors
Tamil television presenters
Television personalities from Tamil Nadu
Male actors in Tamil cinema
21st-century Tamil male actors
Indian male comedians
Male actors from Tamil Nadu
1959 births